Sri Petaling LRT station is a rapid transit station in Sri Petaling, a suburb about 20 km south of Kuala Lumpur, the capital of Malaysia. At that time, Sri Petaling station was named as "Komanwel" station., where "Komanwel" is the Malay spelling for "Commonwealth". The station was opened in commemoration with the 1998 Commonwealth Games in Kuala Lumpur.

The station is on the Sri Petaling Line and was the former southern terminus for passenger services on the line until October 31, 2015. It is the start of the new LRT extension project which extended the current terminus of the line to Putra Heights station. The station is also the namesake for the LRT line.

Sri Petaling LRT station was opened in 1998, along with 17 other stations, which at that time formed the STAR LRT Phase 2. It was then renamed Sri Petaling Line to avoid confusion from names that differ only in the phase number.

Vista Commonwealth condominiums (formerly used as 1998 Commonwealth Games Athletes Village) and the International Medical University (IMU) is within walking distance to this station.

References

External links
Kuala Lumpur MRT & LRT Integrations

Ampang Line
Railway stations opened in 1998